The Simony Act 1713 (13 Ann c 11) was an Act of the Parliament of Great Britain.

The whole Act was repealed by section 1 of, and Part II of the Schedule to, the Statute Law (Repeals) Act 1971.

Title
In the title, the words "for the better" to "England and" were repealed by section 1 of, and Schedule 1 to, the Statute Law Revision Act 1948.

Section 2
In this section, the words of commencement were repealed by section 1 of, and Schedule 1 to, the Statute Law Revision Act 1948.

References

Great Britain Acts of Parliament 1713